Margun or Margoon in Iran may refer to:
 Margun, Fars
 Margun, Sistan and Baluchestan
 Margun, Zanjan
 Margoon Waterfall, in Fars Province